Älskar is the third studio album by Scottish singer-songwriter Nina Nesbitt, released on 2 September 2022 through Cooking Vinyl. It was announced alongside the release of the single "Pressure Makes Diamonds" on 8 June 2022.

Track listing

Charts

References 

2022 albums
Cooking Vinyl albums
Nina Nesbitt albums